Show Me Love is the debut album by American singer Robin S., released on June 21, 1993. It includes the single "Show Me Love" which reached No. 5 on the US Billboard Hot 100, No. 6 in the UK Singles Chart and the top 10 of many other charts around the world. Further singles that were released from the album are "Luv 4 Luv" (titled "Love for Love" on the album), which reached No. 53 in the US and No. 11 in the UK, "What I Do Best" (UK No. 43), "I Want to Thank You" (UK No. 48) and "Back It Up" (UK No. 43).

Critical reception

AllMusic editor Alex Henderson named the album "one of 1993's more memorable R&B/dance music collections", complimenting Robin S. as "a sassy, big-voiced belter who knows how to make sparks fly". He addded further, "The success of her sleek yet gritty hits "Show Me Love" and "Back It Up" led many to think of Robin as a dance-floor diva. But as much as she excels in that area, "My Kind of Man" and "I'm Gonna Love You Right (Tonight)" demonstrate that she has no problem handling the silkiest of slow jams." J.D. Considine from The Baltimore Sun wrote, "Because dance music is usually judged on a single-by-single basis, few house divas ever have much success on the album end of things. Robin S. may prove an exception to that rule." He picked the "stomping, bass-driven" "Show Me Love" and the "equally danceable" "Love for Love" as the "best moments" on the album. He also highlighted the "luscious balladry" of "What I Do Best" and the "gospel-inflected intensity" of "Who's Gonna Raise the Child". Chuck Arnold from Philadelphia Daily News opined that of the dance cuts on the album, "only "Show Me Love" and the spiritual stomper "I Want to Thank You" (co-produced by fierce New York club DJ Junior Vasquez) hold up at home."

Track listing

Personnel
Adapted from AllMusic.

Scott Alspach – drum programming
Elizabeth Barrett – art direction
Poogie Bell – drums
Roger Byrum – saxophone
Mike Cantwell – guitar
Joe Carvello – executive producer
Debbie Cole – backing vocals
Nat Foster – engineer
Ray Gaskins – saxophone
Allan George – engineer, executive producer, producer
Ivan Hampton – drums
George Holz – photography
Paul Jackson Jr. – guest artist, guitar
Craig Kallman – executive producer
La La – producer
Ron Long – bass
Luci Martin – background vocals
Nick Martinelli – mixing, producer
Fred McFarlane – executive producer, keyboards, producer
Kim Miller – backing vocals
P. Dennis Mitchell – engineer, mixing
David Morales – mixing, producer
Joey Moskowitz – keyboards
Jay Oliver – keyboards
Dana Reed – guitar, backing vocals
Robin S. – primary artist, vocals, backing vocals
Ralph Rolle – drums
Vivian Sessoms	– backing vocals
StoneBridge – keyboards, mixing, producer
David Sussman – engineer
Dennis Taylor – backing vocals
Matt Thomas – keyboards, producer
Junior Vasquez – mixing, producer
Bruce Weeden – engineer
Zan – mixing, producer

Charts

References

External links
Show Me Love at Discogs

1993 debut albums
Atlantic Records albums
Big Beat Records (American record label) albums